Thunderchild, Thunder Child or variant, may refer to:

 , a fictional Royal Navy ironclad torpedo steam ram featured in the H.G. Wells novel The War of the Worlds
 Thunderchild First Nation, a Cree tribe and Indian reserve in Saskatchewan, Canada
 "Thunderchild", a record and stagename of James Ash 
 "Thunder Child", a stagename for heavy metal band Warlord musician Mark Zonder
 "Thunderchild", a song from the 1978 album Jeff Wayne's Musical Version of The War of the Worlds
 "Thunderchild", a character from Dick Tracy comics, see List of Dick Tracy characters
 "XSV 17 Thunder Child", A prototype High-Speed Military/Government boat built by Safe Haven Marine.
 "USS Thunderchild", an Akira-class starship featured in Star Trek: First Contact.

See also
 Operation Thunder Child, a 1999 novel by Nick Pope
 Children of the Thunder, a 1988 novel by John Brunner
 Sons of Thunder (disambiguation)